Evangelical Friends Church International (EFCI) is a branch of Quaker yearly meetings (regional associations) located around the world.

Timeline
 1947 - The Association of Evangelical Friends 
 1965 - The Evangelical Friends Alliance
 1989 - Evangelical Friends, International
 2004 - Evangelical Friends Church, International (update to name)

History

Orthodox Friends
The Religious Society of Friends debated a number of issues in the early 19th Century that led the various Friends Meetings to develop separate fellowships.

The first major division dealt with Scriptural authority, among other issues.  "Orthodox Quakers" emphasized Biblical sources while "Hicksite" and his followers believed the inward light was more important than scriptural authority.

The Evangelical Friends Church, International grew out of the Orthodox branch that held to the primacy of scriptural authority.

Gurneyite Friends
The next major controversy led to separation in the Orthodox branch.

"Gurneyite" Friends, were deeply influenced by the evangelical movement (as were other Protestant denominations of the era), especially the ideas of John Wesley.

John Wilbur led a group known as "Wilburites" or "Conservative Friends", who preferred a quietist approach and disavowed Biblical inerrancy as understood by the evangelical group.

Ohio Yearly Meeting
The Ohio Yearly Meeting was originally based in Mt. Pleasant, OH. Following the separation over evangelical teachings, there were two Ohio Yearly Meetings:  "Wilburite" and "Gurneyite".

The "Gurneyite" group relocated to Damascus, OH in 1917, becoming Ohio Yearly Meeting (Damascus). Later, they relocated again, this time to Canton, OH. In 1965 the Ohio Yearly Meeting (Damascus) joined the Evangelical Friends Alliance. In 1971 Ohio Yearly Meeting (Damascus) became Evangelical Friends Church - Eastern Region.

Five Year Meeting
Most of the Gurneyite Friends formed the Five Years Meeting (renamed Friends United Meeting in 1965) as an association of yearly meetings following the adoption of the Richmond Declaration in 1877.

After World War I, the modernist-fundamentalist debate began to divide the Five Years Meeting. In 1926, Oregon Yearly Meeting (now Northwest Yearly Meeting) withdrew from the organization. They were joined in their departure by several other yearly meetings and scattered monthly meetings in the coming years.

Evangelical Friends come together

In 1947, the Association of Evangelical Friends was formed, with triennial meetings which lasted until 1970.  In turn, this led to the formation of the Evangelical Friends Alliance (EFA) in 1965. In 1989 the EFA was superseded by the Evangelical Friends International (EFI), covering four geographic regions (Africa, Asia, Latin America, and North America).  In 2007, Europe was added as a fifth region.  In 2004 the name was changed to the Evangelical Friends Church, International (EFCI) and registered as a not-for-profit [501c3] organization in the state of Oregon.

Distinctives

The Evangelical Friends Church and other Friends
Friends, especially in the United States, are divided today as a result of divisions that took place mostly in the 19th Century. The Evangelical branch is the one that is most similar to other evangelical Christian denominations and differs some from other branches of Quakerism.

Churches
Evangelical Friends may refer to a local congregation as a church, while some other Friends call it a monthly meeting.

Programmed services
EFCI holds programmed (i.e. planned) services, while many other Friends hold silent services in which people speak as they feel led by God.  Programmed services may incorporate silent worship, but it is only one element in the larger service.

Salvation
A key doctrinal issue that sets Evangelical Friends apart from other Quakers is their view of salvation. Evangelical Friends believe that all people are in need of salvation, and that salvation comes to a person by putting his faith in Jesus Christ. Other Friends have a wide range of views on salvation, up to and including beliefs such as religious pluralism. Evangelical Friends support their views on the necessity of salvation as being more in line with the meaning of the Bible.

Biblical authority
Because of Evangelical Friends' origins within the Gurneyite faction during the 19th century series of schisms that divided the Society, some Evangelical Friends rely relatively less on the authority of the Inner Light and more on their belief in the authority of a literal reading of the Scripture.

Allowance for water baptism and Communion
Similar to other branches of Friends, the Evangelical Friends Church affirms baptism and Communion as spiritual realities. These realities are realized in Jesus Christ through the Holy Spirit.  Unlike most of the other branches of Friends, the Evangelical Friends Church allows for individual freedom of conscience in regards to participating in water baptism or in offering and receiving Communion within their churches.

The Evangelical Friends Church and other Evangelicals
The issue that sets Evangelical Friends apart from other evangelical Christians is that they consider themselves part of the larger Friends movement. They also feel that their particular beliefs are consistent with the beliefs of the earliest Friends, such as George Fox (other Friends assert the same about their own beliefs and practices). Evangelical Friends also generally adhere to most, if not all, of the testimonies (core beliefs and values) of Friends (see "Testimonies" under Religious Society of Friends).

Organization
The Evangelical Friends Church, International is divided into several geographical areas called "Regions". Each region has its own director.  A region is composed of the various Yearly Meetings and mission fields within its bounds.

Regions and Yearly Meetings
Evangelical Friends Church / Africa
Rwanda Yearly Meeting
Burundi Yearly Meeting
Evangelical Friends Church / Asia
Bundelkhand Yearly Meeting (India)
Evangelical Friends Church / Europe
Evangelical Friends Church / Latin America
 Including EFC-Brazil Yearly Meeting
Evangelical Friends Church / North America
Alaska Yearly Meeting
Evangelical Friends Church - Eastern Region (United States)
Evangelical Friends Church - Mid-America Yearly Meeting (United States)
Evangelical Friends Church - Southwest (United States)
Northwest Yearly Meeting  (United States)
 Rocky Mountain Yearly Meeting (United States)

Evangelical Friends Missions
Evangelical Friends Mission (EFM) recruits and sends missionaries to various parts of the world. It exists as the international sending agency and global church planting arm of EFCI-NA.

Related ministries and organizations

Camps
Camp Gideon, located near Salineville, Ohio
Quaker Ridge Camp and Retreat Center located near Woodland Park, Colorado
Twin Rocks Camp and Retreat Center, located in western Oregon
Camp Quaker Haven located in Arkansas City, Kansas

Colleges, universities, and seminaries
Azusa Pacific University
Barclay College
George Fox University and Portland Seminary
Malone University
Friends University

Statistics
 over 2,000 Evangelical Friends churches representing more than 200,000 Friends in 35 countries are associated with EFCI.

Associations
Evangelical Friends Church International of North America is part of the National Association of Evangelicals, a large body of Christian denominations and groups in the United States that share evangelical beliefs.

See also
Friends United Meeting
Central Yearly Meeting of Friends
Conservative Friends
Friends General Conference
Beanite Quakerism

References

External links

Evangelical Friends Mission

Christian organizations established in 1989
Quaker organizations established in the 20th century
Evangelical denominations established in the 20th century
International bodies of Protestant denominations
Members of the National Association of Evangelicals
Evangelical denominations in North America
1989 establishments in the United States